Pat O'Shea may refer to:

 Pat O'Shea (Gaelic footballer, born 1888) (1888–1980), won All-Ireland Senior Football Championship titles with Kerry in 1913 and 1914
 Pat O'Shea (Gaelic footballer, born 1966), managed Kerry to the 2007 All-Ireland Senior Football Championship title
 Pat O'Shea (author) (1931–2007), Irish-born author